The 2022–23 Women's EHF Champions League is the 30th edition of Europe's premier club handball tournament, running from 10 September 2022 to 4 June 2023.

Format
The tournament will run using the same format as the previous two seasons. The competition begins with a group stage featuring sixteen teams divided into two groups. Matches are played in a double round-robin system with home-and-away fixtures, fourteen in total for each team. In Groups A and B, the top two teams automatically qualify for the quarter-finals, with teams ranked 3rd to 6th entering the playoff round.

The knockout stage includes four rounds: the playoffs, quarter-finals, and a final-four tournament comprising two semifinals and the final. In the playoffs, eight teams are paired against each other in two-legged home-and-away matches (third-placed in group A plays sixth-placed group B; fourth-placed group A plays fifth-placed group B, etc.). The four aggregate winners of the playoffs advance to the quarterfinals, joining the top-two teams of Groups A and B. The eight quarterfinalist teams are paired against each other in two-legged home-and-away matches, with the four aggregate winners qualifying to the final-four tournament. 

In the final four tournament, the semifinals and the final are played as single matches at a pre-selected host venue. For this tournament, it will be the MVM Dome.

Team allocation

17 teams applied for a place, with nine having a fixed place. The final list was released on 27 June 2022.

Storhamar HE and CS Rapid București will make their debut appearances in the Champions League group stage, while RK Lokomotiva, DHK Baník Most and SG BBM Bietigheim make their return.

Borussia Dortmund's application for a wild card got rejected.

Group stage

The draw took place on 1 July 2022.

Group A

Group B

Knockout stage

Playoffs

Quarterfinals

Final four
The final four will be held at the MVM Dome in Budapest, Hungary on 3 and 4 June 2023.

Bracket

Final

Top goalscorers

References

External links
Official website

 
2022
2022 in handball
2022 in European sport
2023 in European sport
Current handball seasons